The 2011 International GTSprint Series season was the second year of the International GTSprint Series. The season began at Monza on 10 April and finished at Vallelunga on 9 October. Gaetano Ardagna and Giuseppe Cirò won the championship, driving a Ferrari.

Teams and drivers

Calendar and results
Previously, the sixth round was scheduled in Hockenheim on 11 September, but it was canceled before the beginning of the season.

Championship Standings

Drivers' championship
Only the best 12 results counted towards the championship.

† - Drivers did not finish the race, but were classified as they completed over 50% of the race distance.

Teams' Championship

GT2 Class

GT3 Class

GTCup Class

External links
Official Superstars website

International GTSprint Series
Superstars Series seasons